Aidsmap, also known as NAM aidsmap, is a website which publishes independent, accurate and accessible information and news about HIV and AIDS. The aidsmap website is run by a charity based in the United Kingdom, NAM. 

"NAM" originally stood for "national AIDS manual" and referred to a 1987 compendium of all information about HIV published for non-scientists in England. Since aidsmap became an international organisation, NAM is no longer used as an acronym and there is no longer any particular "aids manual" being maintained. 

NAM aidsmap's vision is a world where HIV is no longer a threat to health or happiness.

Timeline of work
NAM was founded in 1987 by Peter Scott, who was then working for the London Lesbian and Gay Switchboard.  He was seeking to address the public's demand for a source of information about HIV. 

Subsequent Directors were Will Anderson (to 1996), Colin Nee (1996–2001), Caspar Thomson (2001–2016) and Matthew Hodson (2016–present).

In 1992 the organisation began publishing the newsletter now called the HIV Treatment Update, which was designed to give patients the information they need to help direct their choices for HIV treatment.

In 1998 aidsmap.com was launched as an online resource for all printed materials. It was a partnership project involving NAM and The British HIV Association, and later the International HIV/AIDS Alliance. The original site editors were Edward King and Keith Alcorn.

In 2006 aidsmap.com was awarded first prize in the Patient Information Website category of the 2006 British Medical Association’s (BMA) Medical Books Competition.

In 2019, NAM aidsmap launched its new aidsmap website after a major redevelopment project.

In December 2019, aidsmapLIVE, an HIV information series broadcast on NAM's social media channels, won both the Innovation and Media award at the nOscars, hosted by Naz Project London.

References

External links
 

HIV/AIDS organizations